The 1961–62 Czechoslovak Extraliga season was the 19th season of the Czechoslovak Extraliga, the top level of ice hockey in Czechoslovakia. 12 teams participated in the league, and Ruda Hvezda Brno won the championship.

First round

Final round

7th–12th place

External links
History of Czechoslovak ice hockey

Czech
Czechoslovak Extraliga seasons
1961 in Czechoslovak sport
1962 in Czechoslovak sport